Genoa C.F.C. Women is an Italian women's football club from Genoa that competes in Serie B.

History
Starting from 2015, following the obligations established by the FIGC for the teams participating in the men's Serie A and Serie B, Genoa started its own women's football section.

Only the youth sector was active until 2018, when Genoa acquired the Lavagnese  women's team that was competing in the Serie B. They got relegated to the Eccellenza, the Italian fourth division, at the end of the 2018/19 season and, in 2020, they got promoted back to the Serie C. After playing in the women's third division for two seasons, they acquired the sporting title of the women's Serie B from Cortefranca in the summer of 2022 and with it the right to register for Serie B 2022/23.

Current squad

Club staff

Honours
Eccellenza:
Winners (1): 2019-20

See Also
Genoa C.F.C.
Genoa C.F.C. Youth Sector

References

External links
 Official Website
 Genoa CFC Women at FIGC

Women's football clubs in Italy
Sport in Genoa